The Jandakot Mound, or Jandakot Groundwater Mound, is an unconfined aquifer in south-western Western Australia. It is the smaller of the two main shallow aquifers near Perth (the other being the Gnangara Mound, north of the Swan River) that together supply about 40% of Perth's drinking water.

It contains an estimated  of fresh water, and the annual recharge can reach . It contributes  annually to Perth's municipal supply of drinking water and is also heavily used for private supplies. Where it is close to the surface, it supports extensive wetland systems, the most important of which are Beeliar Wetlands, Forrestdale and Thomsons Lakes. It also recharges the deeper confined aquifers in the area, the Leederville and Yarragadee Aquifers.

References

 

Aquifers in Australia
Swan Coastal Plain
Water supply and sanitation in Western Australia